Bāyazīd Khān Ansārī Pīr Rōshān or Pīr Rōkhān  (1525–1585) was an Afghan warrior, poet, Sufi, and revolutionary leader. He wrote mostly in Pashto, but also in Persian, Hindustani, and Arabic, while he also spoke Ormuri. He is known for founding the Roshani movement, which gained many followers in the Pashtunistan region of present day countries of Pakistan and Afghanistan and produced numerous Pashto poets and writers.

Pir Roshan created a Pashto alphabet, derived from the Arabic script with 13 new letters. A modified version of this alphabet continues to be used to write Pashto. Pir Roshan wrote Khayr al-Bayān, one of the earliest known books containing Pashto prose.

Pir Roshan assembled Pashtun tribesmen to fight against the Mughal emperor Akbar in response to Akbar's continuous military agitations. The Mughals referred to Pir Roshan as Pīr-e Tārīk. 

Due to Pir Roshan's spiritual and religious hold over a large portion of Pashtuns, Akbar enlisted religious figures into the struggle, most notably Pir Baba (Sayyid Ali Tirmizi) and Akhund Darweza. The Mughals persecuted Pir Roshan's followers and executed many of them. A Mughal army eventually killed Pir Roshan and most of his sons. Only his youngest son, Pir Jalala, survived the attack, and later took up arms against the Mughals and became the new leader of the Roshani movement. 

Roshani followers in Waziristan, Kurram, Tirah, Loya Paktia, Loy Kandahar (including Kasi tribesmen), and Nangarhar continued their struggle against the Mughals for about a hundred years after Pir Roshan's death.

Biography

Bayazid was born in 1525 just outside Jalandhar in Punjab (present-day India), but early in his childhood, he moved with his family to their ancestral homeland of Kaniguram in South Waziristan (present-day Pakistan). His family was one of the many Afghan families who fled back to Ancestral Pashtun Land  after the Turkic ruler Babur overthrew the Afghan Lodi dynasty in India in 1526. His father, Abdullah, was an Islamic Qadi (judge). However, his father and relatives, and later Bayazid himself, also traded between Afghanistan and India. Bayazid was against many of the customs which prevailed in the area and the benefits which his family received due to being perceived as scholarly and devout. He was known for being stubborn, strong-willed and outspoken.

Bayazid began teaching at the age of 40. His message was well received by the Mohmand and Shinwari tribesmen. He then went to the Peshawar valley and spread his message to the Khalils and Muhammadzais. He sent missionaries (khalifas) to various parts of South and Central Asia. He sent one of his disciples, Dawlat Khan, along with his book Sirat at-Tawhid to Mughal Emperor Akbar. Khalifa Yusuf was sent along with his book Fakhr at-Talibin to the ruler of Badakhshan, Mirza Sulayman. Mawdud Tareen was sent to propagate his message to Kandahar, Balochistan, and Sindh. Arzani Khweshki was sent to India to convey the message to common people there. Besides, he also sent his deputies to Kabul, Balkh, Bukhara, and Samarkand.

However, when he and his followers started spreading their movement amongst the Yousafzais, Bayazid came into direct confrontation with the orthodox followers of Pir Baba in Buner. He established a base in the Tirah valley where he rallied other tribes. In Oxford History of India, Vincent Smith describes this as the first "Pashtun renaissance" against Mughal rule. When Mughal Emperor Akbar proclaimed Din-i Ilahi, Bayazid raised the flag of open rebellion. He led his army in several successful skirmishes and battles against Mughal forces, but they were routed in a major battle in Nangarhar by Mughal General Muhsin Khan.

During the 1580s, Yusufzais rebelled against the Mughals and joined the Roshani movement of Pir Roshan. In late 1585, Mughal Emperor Akbar sent military forces under Zain Khan Koka and Birbal to crush the Roshani rebellion. In February 1586, about 8,000 Mughal soldiers, including Birbal, were killed near the Karakar Pass between Buner and Swat while fighting against the Yusufzai lashkar led by Kalu Khan. This was the greatest disaster faced by the Mughal army during Akbar's reign. However, during the attack, Pir Roshan was himself killed by the Mughal army near Topi. In 1587, Mughal general Man Singh I defeated 20,000 strong Roshani soldiers and 5,000 horsemen. Pir Roshan's five sons, however, continued fighting against the Mughals until about 1640.

Successors

Bayazid's sons were put to death with the exception of his youngest, Jalala, who was pardoned by Akbar as he was only 14 years old when he was captured. He later took up arms as Pir Jalala Khan and successfully engaged the Mughal armies. It is believed by some that the city of Jalalabad is named for him. After his death in battle, Jalala's nephew Ahdad Khan (also spelled Ihdad) took charge of the struggle.

As part of a concerted campaign to destroy the Roshanis around 1619 or 1620, Mahabat Khan, under the Emperor Jahangir, massacred 300 Daulatzai Orakzai in the Tirah. Ghairat Khan was sent to the Tirah region to engage the Roshani forces with a large military force via Kohat. The Mughal forces were repulsed, but six years later Muzaffar Khan marched against Ahdad Khan. After several months of intense fighting, Ahdad Khan was killed. The death of Jahangir in 1627 led to a general uprising of the Pashtuns against Mughal forces. Ahdad's son Abdul Qadir returned to Tirah to seek vengeance. Under his command, the Roshani defeated Muzaffar Khan's forces en route from Peshawar to Kabul, killing Muzaffar. Abdul Qadir plundered Peshawar and invested the citadel.

It was not until the time of Mughal Emperor Shah Jehan (1628–1658) that a truce was brokered – between Akbar's grandson and Bayazid's great grandson. Bayazid Khan's descendants moved to Jullundhar and purchased lands to establish Basti Danishmandan, Basti Sheikh Derveish and later Basti Baba Khel. The Baba Khel branch of the Baraki lived in fortress-like compounds fighting the Sikhs who surrounded their lands until the early 20th century.

Roshani movement 

Bayazid became known for his philosophical thinking with its strong Sufi influences, radical for the times and unusual for the region. He became widely known as Pir Roshan, which in Pashto means "the radiant or luminous Sufi master". He formed the Roshani movement, which had one central tenet: the equality of every man and woman. This advocated that religious and political leaders should be chosen by merit instead of birthright, and that women should receive education and equal treatment.

During the 19th century, orientalist scholars translating texts from Pashto and other regional texts termed his movement a "sect" which believed in the transmigration of souls and in the representation of God through individuals. Conspiracy theorists have likened it to remnants of the hassassin or having influenced the creation of the Illuminati in Bavaria. Many European researchers continue to hold this view, though others believe Mughal historians proliferated this as propaganda to dilute the major focus of the movement of fighting against Akbar and his Din-i-Ilahi.

Writings

Bayazid invented Pushto script to ensure the emergence of Pashto literature and writing. As Arabic script did not correspond to all of the sounds in spoken Pushto, he invented 13 characters to represent these additional sounds. Some of these characters indicated differences between hard and soft dialects of Pashto.

Bayazid is credited with writing the first book in Pashto language, Khair-ul-Bayan, beginning Pashto literature.  It was written in Pashto, Persian, Arabic, and Hindi, and is considered the first book of Pashto prose. The book was thought to be lost until an original handwritten Persian manuscript was found in the University of Tübingen, Germany. Maulana Abdul Qadir of Pashto Academy - Peshawar, obtained and translated it, publishing a Pashto edition in 1987.

Bayazid wrote nearly a dozen books, although less than half of these have survived, mostly in private and family libraries. His works include Khayr al-Bayan, Maksud al- Muminin, Surat-i Tawhid, Fakhr, Hal-Nama Maksud al- Muminin, Surat-i Tawhid, Fakhr, and Hal-Nama  Khilwat.

Bayazid's contribution to Pashto nationalism and language has been neglected, possibly because he was from the tribe of Baraki, whose mother tongue was Ormuri (a different East Iranic language) and whose lineage was attributed to the Kurdistan region rather than the Pashtun confederations, although some suggest that the Barakzai (sons of Barak) are originally "Baraki".  Although his ideas spread beyond the Pashtunistan region, some scholars believe that he and his movement were demonized by the Mughals.

Recent books and research
The invading armies in Afghanistan seem to have paid significant attention from a historical perspective. During the Soviet Invasion of Afghanistan, Saint Petersburg State University Institute of Oriental Studies seemed to have been the institution tasked to study the Roshani movement in order to understand their foe. Waziristan was the focal point for some of the toughest fighters against the Soviets.

Aminullah Khan Gandapur, in his book Tārīkh-i-Sarzamīn-i-Gōmal (History of the Gomal Land; National Book Foundation-2008,2nd Ed. ISBN 978-969-23423-2-2; P-57-63), ascribed a chapter to the Roshani movement and to their strife and achievement with the sword and the pen.

Following the 2002 invasion, Western scholars were again sent into the field to study and understand the movement. Dr. Sergei Andreyev, was sent on UN assignment to Afghanistan, while simultaneously funded by the Institute of Ismaili Studies to research and write a book on the movement. There have been multiple editions of this book; however its sale and distribution remains restricted in 2011.

See also
 Khushal Khattak
 Mullah Powindah
 Mirzali Khan

References

External links
 Desecration of Pir Roshan's grave and dead body
 Roshniya movement

1525 births
1580s deaths
History of Khyber Pakhtunkhwa
Medieval India
Pashtun people
People from Jalandhar
People from South Waziristan
Shrines in Pakistan
North Waziristan District
Proto-socialists